This is a list of women writers born in Australia or closely associated with it in their writings. As with other Wikipedia page lists, writers need a page before inclusion.

A
Mena Kasmiri Abdullah (born 1930), short story writer
Joyce Ackroyd (1918–1991), academic, translator and author
Glenda Adams (1939–2007), novelist and short story writer
Patsy Adam-Smith (1924–2001), historian
Jane Alison (born 1961), novelist and memoir writer
Ethel Anderson (1883–1958), poet, essayist, novelist and painter
Jessica Anderson (1916–2010), fiction writer
Diane Armstrong (born 1939), novelist, biographer and freelance journalist and travel writer
Millicent Armstrong (1888–1973), playwright and farmer
Keri Arthur, writer of fantasy, horror and romance novels
Helen Asher (1927 – c. 2004), novelist
Melissa Ashley (born 1973), novelist
Asphyxia (living), puppeteer and children's author
Thea Astley (1925–2004), novelist
Tilly Aston (1873–1947), blind poet and prose writer
Louisa Atkinson (1834–1872), novelist, botanist and illustrator
Karen Attard (born 1958), fantasy and short fiction writer
Bunty Avieson (living), journalist and novelist

B
Van Badham (born 1974), playwright and novelist
Kate Baker (1861–1953), critic, editor and biographer
Margaret Balderson (born 1935), children's writer
Faith Bandler (1918–2015), writer and civil rights activist
Marjorie Barnard (1897–1987), novelist and historian collaborating with Flora Eldershaw as M. Barnard Eldershaw
Charlotte Barton (1797–1867), children's writer and educationalist
Emily Mary Barton (1817–1909), poet
Marnie Bassett (1890–1980), historian and biographer
Daisy Bates (1859–1951), journalist and anthropologist
Catherine Bateson (born 1960), novelist and poet
Barbara Baynton (1857–1929), fiction writer
Jean Bedford (born 1946), fiction writer
Ruth Bedford (1882–1963), poet, playwright and children's writer
Larissa Behrendt (born 1969), legal academic and novelist
Diane Bell (born 1943), anthropologist
Hilary Bell (born 1966), playwright
Mary Montgomerie Bennett (1881–1961), biographer and civil rights advocate
Patricia Bernard (born 1942), writer of speculative fiction
Barbara Biggs (born 1956), journalist, writer and campaigner
Carmel Bird (born 1940), fiction writer
Winifred Birkett (1887–1966), novelist and poet
Dora Birtles (1903–1992), fiction writer, poet and travel writer
Marie Bjelke-Petersen (1874–1969), novelist
Georgia Blain (1964–2016), novelist, journalist and biographer
Capel Boake, pseudonym of Doris Boake Kerr (1889–1944), novelist
Jenny Boult (born 1951), poet
Tess Brady (born 1948), fiction, non-fiction, radio drama and children's books
Mona Brand (1915–2007), poet, playwright and non-fiction writer
Doris Brett (born 1950), poet, novelist and non-fiction writer
Hilda Bridges (1881–1971), novelist and short story writer
Annie Bright (1840–1913), journalist, non-fiction writer and spiritualist
Hesba Brinsmead (1922–2003), novelist
Anne Brooksbank (born 1943), scriptwriter and playwright
Mary Anne Broome, Lady Broome (1831–1911), novelist, travel writer and children's writer
Pam Brown (born 1948), poet and prose writer
Mary Grant Bruce (1878–1958), children's author and journalist
Alyssa Brugman (born 1974), author of fiction for young adults
Anna Maria Bunn (1808–1899), novelist
J. C. Burke (born 1965), novelist
Janine Burke (born 1952), art critic, historian and novelist
Joanne Burns (born 1945), poet and prose writer
Marie Beuzeville Byles (1900–1979), travel and non-fiction writer

C
Caroline Caddy (born 1944), poet
Kathleen Caffyn, also pseudonym Iota (1853–1926), novelist
Mena Calthorpe (1905–1996), novelist
Ada Cambridge (1844–1926), novelist, poet, children's writer and autobiographer
Marion May Campbell (born 1948), novelist, performance writer and memoirist
Patricia Carlon (1927–2002), crime novelist
Jennings Carmichael, pseudonym of Grace Elizabeth Jennings Carmichael (1868–1904), poet
Maie Casey, Baroness Casey (1910–1983), poet, librettist, biographer and memoirist
Deirdre Cash, pseudonym Criena Rohan (1924–1963), novelist
Lee Cataldi (born 1942), poet
Nancy Cato (1917–2000), historical novelist, poet and biographer
Nan Chauncy (1900–1970), children's writer
Connie Christie (1908–1989), children's writer/illustrator, photographer and commercial artist
Ellen Clacy, pseudonym Cycla (1830–1901), novelist and nonfiction writer
Monica Clare, (1924–1973), novelist
Mavis Thorpe Clark (1909–1999), nonfiction and children's writer
Coralie Clarke, later Coralie Clarke Rees (1908–1972), travel writer
Maxine Beneba Clarke (born 1979), poet and short story writer
Inga Clendinnen (1934–2016), author and historian
Charmian Clift (1923–1969), novelist, nonfiction and autobiography writer
Jennifer Compton (born 1949), poet
Dorothy Cottrell (1902–1957), novelist
Anna Couani (1948), novelist, poet and visual artist
Emily Coungeau (1860–1936), poet
Jessie Couvreur, pseudonym Tasma (1848–1897), novelist
Alice Guerin Crist (1876–1941), poet, novelist, short story writer and journalist
Alison Croggon (born 1962), poet, playwright, fantasy novelist and librettist
M. T. C. Cronin (born 1963), poet
Zora Cross (1890–1964), poet, novelist and journalist
Cecily Crozier (1911–2006), artist, poet and literary editor
Jean Curlewis (1898–1930), children's writer
Dymphna Cusack (1902–1981), novelist and playwright

D
Marguerite Dale (1883–1963), playwright and feminist
Blanche d'Alpuget (born 1944), biographer, novelist and activist
Kathleen Dalziel (1881–1969), poet
Eleanor Dark/Patricia O'Rane (1901–1985), novelist
Norma Davis (1905–1945), poet
Sarah Day (born 1958), English-born Australian poet
Alma De Groen (born 1941), New Zealand-born playwright
Michelle de Kretser (born 1957), novelist
Dulcie Deamer (1890–1972), novelist, poet, journalist and actor
Enid Derham (1882–1941), poet and academic
Jessica Dettmann (living), novelist
Catherine Deveny (born 1968), journalist, comedian, author
Jean Devanny (1894–1962), novelist and nonfiction writer
Rosemary Dobson (1920–2012), poet
Nance Donkin (1915–2008), children's writer and journalist
Sara Douglass (1957–2011), fantasy writer
Ceridwen Dovey (born 1980), novelist
Henrietta Drake-Brockman (1901–1968), journalist and novelist
Ursula Dubosarsky (born 1961), writer of fiction and non-fiction for children and young adults
 Eva Duldig (born 1938), Austrian-born Australian and Dutch tennis player, memoir author
Susan Duncan (born 1951), memoirist and novelist
Alice Duncan-Kemp (1901–1988), writer and Indigenous rights activist
Mary Durack (1913–1994) novelist and historian
Vera Dwyer (1889–1967), novelist

E
Alice Eather (1988/89–2017), slam poet, environmental campaigner and teacher
Robyn Eckersley (born 1958), political theorist
Arabella Edge (living), English-born short story writer and novelist
Harriet Edquist (living), architectural historian and curator
Elizabeth Eggleston (1934–1976), activist, author and lawyer
Anne Elder (1918–1976), poet and ballet dancer
Flora Eldershaw (1897–1956), novelist, critic and historian
M. Barnard Eldershaw, pseudonym of collaborators Marjorie Barnard and Flora Eldershaw
Edith Mary England (1899–1979/1981), novelist and poet
Fotini Epanomitis (born 1969), novelist
Rica Erickson (1908–2009), botanical and historical writer
Matilda Jane Evans, pseudonym Maud Jeanne Franc (1827–1886), novelist

F
Diane Fahey (born 1945), poet and short story writer
Suzanne Falkiner (born 1952), novelist and non-fiction writer
Beverley Farmer (1941–2018), novelist and short story writer
Beatrice Faust (1939–2019), women's activist and non-fiction writer
Mary Finnin (1906–1992) artist, art teacher and poet
Lala Fisher (1872–1929), poet and editor
Kathleen Fitzpatrick (1905–1990), historian, biographer and critic
Jane Ada Fletcher (1870–1956), nature writer and children's writer
Pat Flower (1914–1977), writer of plays, TV plays and novels
Mary Hannay Foott (1846–1918), poet and editor
Mabel Forrest (1872–1935), novelist and poet
Elaine Forrestal (born 1941), children's writer
Thelma Forshaw (1923–1995), fiction writer and reviewer
Jessie Forsyth (1847/49 – 1937), newspaper editor; short stories, poems
Mary Fortune, pseudonym Waif Wanter (c. 1833–1911), detective story writer
Lynn Foster (1914–1985), playwright and novelist
Miles Franklin, pseudonym Brent of Bin Bin (1879–1954), novelist and journalist
Mary Fullerton, pseudonyms include E and Alpenstock (1868–1946), poet and novelist

G
Katherine Gallagher (born 1935), poet
Helen Garner (born 1942), fiction writer, screenwriter and journalist
Catherine Gaskin (1929–2009), romance novelist
Sulari Gentill, pseudonym S. D. Gentill (living), writer of historical crime and other fiction
Doris Gentile (1894–1972), fiction writer
May Gibbs (1877–1969), children's author, illustrator and cartoonist
Anna Goldsworthy (born 1974), writer, teacher and classical pianist
Sophie Gonzales (born 1993), writer of young adult romantic comedies
Charmaine Papertalk Green (born 1962), poet and artist
Kate Grenville (born 1950), fiction and non-fiction writer and biographer

H
Lyndall Hadow (1903–1976), short story writer and journalist
Rosalie Ham (born 1955), novelist and stage writer
Susan Hampton (born 1949), poet
Eunice Hanger (1911–1972), playwright and educator
Barbara Hanrahan (1939–1991), novelist and artist
Lesbia Harford (1891–1927), poet, novelist and activist
Beverley Harper (1943–2002), author of novels set in Africa
Jennifer Harrison (born 1955), poet
Elizabeth Harrower (1928–2020), novelist and short story writer
Gwen Harwood (1920–1995), poet and librettist
Libby Hathorn (born 1943), poet, librettist, children's author
Susan Hawthorne (born 1951), fiction and non-fiction writer, poet and publisher
Anita Heiss (born 1968), non-fiction and fiction writer, poet and commentator
Dorothy Hewett (1923–2002), playwright and poet
Ernestine Hill (1900–1972), journalist, travel writer and novelist
Helen Hodgman (born 1945), novelist and screenwriter
Ada Augusta Holman (1869–1949), journalist, novelist and nonfiction writer
Janette Turner Hospital (born 1942), fiction writer

I
Anne Bower Ingram (1937–2010), children's author and publisher

J
Linda Jaivin (born 1955), novelist and non-fiction writer
Barbara James (1943–2003), historian
Florence James (1902–1993), author and literary agent
Rebecca James (born 1970), young adults' fiction writer
Wendy James (born 1966), crime novelist
Winifred Lewellin James (1876–1941), novelist and travel writer
Emma Jane (born 1969), novelist and media commentator
Charlotte Jay, pseudonym of Geraldine Halls (1919–1996), mystery writer
Barbara Jefferis (1917–2004), radio dramatist and novelist
Sheila Jeffreys (born 1948), feminist scholar and writer
Grace Jennings-Edquist (born 1988), journalist and non-fiction writer
Kate Jennings (1948–2021), poet, essayist, memoirist and novelist
Helen Jerome (1883–1958), poet, playwright and nonfiction writer
Alexandra Joel, fiction and nonfiction writer
Rebecca Johnson (born 1966), children's fiction and non-fiction writer
Susan Johnson (born 1956), fiction writer
Dorothy Johnston (born 1948), writer of literary fiction and crime novelist
Elizabeth Jolley (1923–2007), novelist
Gail Jones (born 1955), novelist and academic
Jill Jones (born 1951), poet
Laura Jones (born 1951), screenwriter
Margaret Jones (1923–2006), writer of political thrillers and non-fiction
Toni Jordan (born 1966), novelist
Mireille Juchau (born 1969), novelist

K
Elizabeth Kata (1912–1998), novelist
Nancy Keesing (1923–1993), poet, novelist and non-fiction writer
Antigone Kefala (1935–2022), poet and fiction writer
Gwen Kelly (1922–2012), fiction writer and poet
Nora Kelly (born late 19th century in New Zealand) journalist, poet and playwright
Hannah Kent (born 1985), historical novelist
Jacqueline Kent (born 1947), biographer, non-fiction writer and journalist
Doris Boake Kerr, pseudonym Capel Boake (1899–1945), novelist
Robin Klein (born 1936), children's writer
Marion Knowles (1865–1949), poet, novelist and journalist
Sarah Krasnostein, American-Australian non-fiction writer and legal academic

L
Gertrude Langer (1908–1984), art critic
Eve Langley (1908–1974), novelist and poet
Coral Lansbury (1929–1991), novelist and academic
Justine Larbalestier (born 1967), young adults' fiction writer
Glenda Larke (living), fantasy novelist and non-fiction writer
Nel Law (1914–1990), artist, poet and diarist
Louisa Lawson (1848–1920), poet, writer and feminist
Sylvia Lawson (1932–2017), historian, journalist and critic
Simone Lazaroo (born 1961), novelist
Caroline Woolmer Leakey (1827–1881), poet and novelist
Ida Lee (1865–1943), historian and poet
Valentine Leeper (1900–2001), classicist, polemicist and correspondent
Julia Leigh (born 1970), novelist, screenwriter and film director
Constance Le Plastrier (1864–1938), writer, schoolteacher and botanist
Robin Levett (1925–2008), travel writer, novelist and philanthropist
Tanya Levin (born 1971), non-fiction writer and social worker
Wendy Lewis (born 1962), non-fiction writer and playwright
Bella Li (born 1983), poet and editor
Kate Lilley (born 1960), poet and academic
Lady Joan A'Beckett Lindsay (1896–1984), novelist
Rose Lindsay (1885–1978), biographer, artist's model and printmaker
Marie Lion (1855–1922), novelist
Carol Liston (living), historian
Ellen Liston (1838–1885), fiction writer and poet
Kate Llewellyn (born 1936), poet, diarist and travel writer
Lilian Locke (1869–1950), short story writer
Sumner Locke (1881–1917), fiction writer, dramatist and poet
Amanda Lohrey (born 1947), novelist and essayist
Joan London (born 1948), fiction writer and screenwriter
Abie Longstaff (living), children's writer
Gabrielle Lord (born 1946), crime novelist and short story writer
Melissa Lucashenko (born 1967), fiction, non-fiction and young adults' writer
Laura Bogue Luffman (1846–1929), English-born writer and journalist
Catharine Lumby (living), journalist and academic
Dame Enid Lyons (1897–1981), biographer and politician
Edith Joan Lyttleton, pseudonym G. B. Lancaster (1873–1945), novelist

M
Constance Jane McAdam, pseudonym Constance Clude (1872–1951), writer and suffragette
Maxine McArthur (born 1962), science fiction writer
Georgiana Huntly McCrae (1804–1890), painter and diarist
Colleen McCullough (1937–2015), novelist
Nan McDonald (1921–1974), poet and editor
Ella May McFadyen (1887–1976), poet, journalist and children's writer
Fiona McFarlane (born 1978), novelist
Fiona McGregor (born 1965), writer and performance artist
Siobhán McHugh, Irish-Australian author, podcaster and documentary-maker
Elisabeth MacIntyre (1916–2004), children's writer
Louise Mack (1870–1935), poet, journalist and novelist
Edith McKay (1891–1963), fiction writer
Dorothea Mackellar (1885–1968), poet and fiction writer
Tamara McKinley (born 1948), novelist
Rhyll McMaster (born 1947), poet and novelist
Barbara McNamara, pseudonym Anne Willard (1913–2000), novelist
Bertha McNamara (1853–1931), socialist and feminist pamphleteer and bookseller
Kit McNaughton (c.1887–1953), nurse and diarist
Jennifer Maiden (born 1949), poet
Barbara York Main (born 1929), arachnologist
Alana Mann (fl. 2000s), non-fiction writer on food politics
Emily Manning, pseudonym Australie (1845–1890), poet and journalist
Chris Mansell (born 1953), poet and publisher
Melina Marchetta (born 1965), novelist
Mary Marlowe (1884–1962), actress, writer and journalist
Catherine Edith Macauley Martin (1847–1937), novelist and journalist
Olga Masters (1919–1986), fiction writer and journalist
Christobel Mattingley (1931–2019), children's writer
Jan Mayman (died 2021), journalist
Gillian Mears (1964–2016), fiction writer
Wolla Meranda, (1863–1951), novelist
Gwen Meredith (1907–2006), playwright, scriptwriter and novelist
Louisa Meredith (1812–1895), fiction and non-fiction writer, poet and artist
Elyne Mitchell (1913–2002), children's writer
Drusilla Modjeska (born 1946), writer and editor
Dora Montefiore (1851–1933), poet, autobiographer, suffragist and socialist
Finola Moorhead (born 1947), fiction and non-fiction writer, playwright, essayist and poet
Elinor Mordaunt (1872–1942), writer and traveller
Musette Morell (1898–1950), playwright, children's writer and poet
Sally Morgan (born 1951), Aboriginal writer and artist
Liane Moriarty (born 1966), novelist
Meaghan Morris (born 1950), cultural studies scholar
Myra Morris (1893–1966), poet, novelist and children's writer
Di Morrissey (born 1943), novelist
Sally Morrison (born 1946), biographer and fiction writer
Mary Braidwood Mowle (1827–1857), diarist
Nina Murdoch (1890–1976), biographer, travel writer, journalist and poet
Joanna Murray-Smith (born 1962), playwright, screenwriter, novelist and librettist

N
Joice NanKivell Loch (1887–1982), prose writer
Jill Neville (1932–1997), novelist, playwright and poet
Brenda Niall (born 1930), biographer, literary critic and journalist
Joyce Nicholson (1919–2001), author and businesswoman
Deborah Niland (born 1950), writer and illustrator of children's books
Cynthia Reed Nolan (1908–1976), novelist and travel writer
Oodgeroo Noonuccal (1920–1993), Aboriginal political activist, artist and educator
Marlene Norst (1930–2010), Austrian-born linguist, pedagogue and philanthropist
Joanne Nova, science writer, blogger and speaker

O
Kathleen O'Brien (1914–1991), comic book artist, book illustrator and fashion artist
Mary-Louise O'Callaghan (living), journalist and non-fiction author
Mary-Anne O'Connor (living), novelist
Mietta O'Donnell (1950–2001), food writer, restaurateur and chef
Pixie O'Harris (1903–1991), children's author and illustrator
Audrey Oldfield (1925–2010), historian and children's writer
Narelle Oliver (1960–2016), artist, printmaker and children's author/illustrator
Kate Orman (born 1968), science fiction writer
Beatrice Osborn, pseudonym Margaret Fane (1887–1962), novelist and poet
Caroline Overington (born 1970), journalist and author
Jan Owen (born 1940), poet

P
Margaret Paice (born 1920), children's writer and illustrator
Helen Palmer (1917–1979), publisher, educationalist and historian
Nettie Palmer (1885–1964), poet, essayist and literary critic
Laura Palmer-Archer (1864–1929), short story writer under the pseudonym Bushwoman
Susan Parisi (born 1958), Canadian-born writer of horror fiction
Ruth Park (1917–2010), novelist and children's writer
Catherine Langloh Parker (c.1855–1940), fiction writer and Aboriginal folklorist
Menie Parkes (1839–1915), poet and short story writer
Anne Spencer Parry (1931–1985), fantasy writer
Jacqueline Pascarl (born 1963), memoirist and parents' rights advocate
Ethel Pedley (1859–1898), author and musician
Grace Perry (1927–1987), poet, publisher and editor
Hoa Pham (living), fiction and children's writer
Nancy Phelan (1913–2008), novelist and travel writer
Joan Phipson (1912–2003), children's writer
Phyllis Piddington (1910–2001), novelist, poet and short story writer
Doris Pilkington Garimara (1937–2014), autobiographical novelist
Marie E. J. Pitt (1869–1948), poet
Marjorie Pizer (1920–2016), poet
Gillian Polack (born 1961), writer and editor of speculative fiction
Leonora Polkinghorne (1873–1953), women's activist and writer
Dorothy Featherstone Porter (1954–2008), poet
Marie Porter (born 1939), researcher, writer and welfare advocate
Sue-Ann Post (born 1964), comedian and writer
Eve Pownall (1901–1982), children's writer and historian
Rosa Praed, also as Mrs Campbell Praed (1851–1935), novelist
Evadne Price (1888–1985) writer and media personality
Katharine Susannah Prichard (1883–1969), novelist and playwright
Alice Pung (born 1981), novelist and memoir writer, editor and lawyer
Lillian Pyke (1881–1927), children's writer and, as Erica Maxwell, novelist

Q
Betty Quin (died 1993), theatre manager, playwright and screenwriter
Tarella Quin (1877–1934), children's writer

R
Thérèse Radic (born 1935), playwright and musicologist
Stephanie Radok (born 1954), artist and writer
Jennifer Rankin (1941–1979), poet and playwright
Kerry Reed-Gilbert (1956–2019), poet and author
Elizabeth Julia Reid (1915–1974), Catholic journalist and author
Ethel Richardson, pseudonym Henry Handel Richardson (1870–1946), novelist
Elizabeth Riddell, also Betty Riddell (1910–1998), poet and journalist
Judith Rodriguez (1936–2018), poet
Jill Roe (1940–2017), historian, academic and author
Betty Roland (1903–1996), playwright, novelist and children's writer
Heather Rose (born 1964), novelist
Agnes Rose-Soley, pseudonym Rose de Boheme (1847–1938), journalist and poet
Alice Grant Rosman (1887–1961), novelist
Jennifer Rowe, pseudonym Emily Rodda (born 1948), novelist
Gig Ryan (born 1956), poet

S
Eva Sallis, pseudonym Eva Hornung (born 1964), novelist
Dorothy Lucy Sanders, also Lucy Walker (1907–1987), novelist
Dipti Saravanamuttu (born 1960), Sri Lankan-Australian poet and academic
Julianne Schultz (born 1956), non-fiction writer
Margaret Scott (1934–2005), poet, critic and academic
Rosie Scott (1948–2017), novelist
Jocelynne Scutt (born 1947), non-fiction writer and lawyer plus crime fiction and short stories under noms-de-plume
Catherine Shepherd (1901–1976), playwright
Helen Simpson (1897–1940), novelist, playwright and historian
Nardi Simpson (born 1975), novelist and musician
Sanu Sharma, Nepalese-Australian novelist and storywriter 
Tracy Sorensen, novelist and academic
Catherine Helen Spence (1825–1910), novelist, journalist and social reformer
Eleanor Spence (1928–2008), children's author
Dale Spender (born 1943), feminist scholar, writer and consultant
Lady Jean Maud Spender, also as J. M. Spender (1901–1970), crime novelist
Nicolette Stasko (born 1950), poet, novelist and non-fiction writer
Christina Stead (1902–1983), novelist
Amanda Stewart (born 1959), poet and sound/performance artist
Ethel Nhill Victoria Stonehouse (1883–1964), novelist and poet
Agnes L. Storrie (1865–1936), poet and writer
Jennifer Strauss (born 1933), poet and academic
Anne Summers (born 1945), writer and columnist
Bobbi Sykes (1943–2010), poet and author

T
Lian Tanner (born 1951), children's author
Cory Taylor (1955–2016), children's author and memoirist
Kay Glasson Taylor, pseudonym Daniel Hamline (1893–1998), children's author
Kylie Tennant (1912–1988), novelist, playwright, historian and children's author
Angela Thirkell, also Leslie Parker (1890–1961), novelist
Margaret Thomas (1843–1929), travel writer, poet and artist
Holly Throsby (born 1978), novelist
Glen Tomasetti (1929–2003), singer-songwriter, novelist and poet
Jessica Townsend (born 1985), children's fantasy author
Pamela Lyndon Travers (1899–1996), children's author
Margaret Trist (1914–1986), short story writer and novelist
Ethel Turner (1872–1958), children's author and novelist
Lilian Turner (1867–1956), children's novelist

U
Terry Underwood (born 1944), author
Jessie Urquhart (1890–1948), novelist and journalist

V
Elise Valmorbida, fiction and non-fiction writer
Lin Van Hek (born 1944), fiction writer
Joanne van Os, writer of memoirs and children's and adult fiction
Elizabeth Vassilieff (1917–2007), non-fiction writer and critic
Barbara Vernon (1916–1978), playwright, scriptwriter and radio announcer
Julienne van Loon (born 1970), novelist and non-fiction writer
Mary Therese Vidal (1815–1873), novelist
Vicki Viidikas (1948–1998), poet and prose writer
Michelle Vogel (born 1972), film historian, author and editor

W
Vikki Wakefield (born 1970), young adult fiction writer
Kath Walker (1920–1993), Aboriginal poet, short story writer and artist
Lucy Walker, pseudonym of Dorothy Lucie Sanders (1907–1987), romance novelist
Dorothy Wall (1894–1942), children's author and illustrator
Ania Walwicz (1951–2020), poet, prose writer and visual artist
Nadia Wheatley (born 1949), children's novelist and freelance writer
Ellen Whinnett (born 1971), journalist
Margaret Whitlam (1919–2012), social campaigner and autobiographical writer
Anna Wickham, pseudonym of Edith Hepburn, (1883–1949), poet and playwright
Rosemary Wighton (1925–1994), literary editor, author and adviser on women's affairs
Dora Wilcox (1873–1953), poet and playwright
Kim Wilkins (born 1966), popular fiction writer
Marian Wilkinson (born 1954), journalist and author
Donna Williams (1963–2017), writer, singer-songwriter, screenwriter and sculptor
Ruth Williams (writer) (1897–1962), children's writer
Margaret Wilson, television writer
Tara June Winch (born 1983), novelist and short story writer
Dallas Winmar (living), playwright
Eliza Winstanley / Elizabeth Winstanley / Ariele (1818–1882), writer and stage actress
Eleanor Witcombe (1923–2018), screenwriter
Amy Witting, pseudonym of Joan Austral Fraser (1918–2001), novelist and poet
Sabina Wolanski (1927–2011), Holocaust survivor and autobiographer
Fiona Wood (born 1958), young adults' novelist and television scriptwriter
Susan Nugent Wood, (1836–1880), Australian-born New Zealand poet and essayist
Elizabeth Wood-Ellem (1930–2012), Tongan-born historian
Jena Woodhouse (born 1949), novelist and poet
Angela Woollacott (born 1955), historian
Alexis Wright (born 1950), fiction and non-fiction writer
Judith Wright (1915–2000), poet and environmental activist
June Wright (1919–2012), crime and non-fiction writer
Patricia Wrightson (1921–2010), children's writer
Ida Alexa Ross Wylie (1885–1959), novelist

Z
Rose Zwi (born 1928), Mexican-born South African-Australian fiction writer
Fay Zwicky (1933–2017), poet, short story writer, critic and academic

References

 
Australian women writers, List of
Writers
Women writers, List of Australian
Australian literature-related lists